was a Japanese businessman.

Career
He graduated from Hitotsubashi University (then Koto Shogyo Gakko).

Kagami was a leader in Japan's maritime insurance business. From 1925 to 1939, Kagami was chairman of Tokyo Marine Insurance (Tokio Kaijo Kasai).  In the same time period, he also headed other companies; and he was on the board of the core holding company of the Mitsubishi organization.

In 1929-1935, he was president of Nippon Yusen.  For a time, he was also president of the Mitsubishi Bank.

References

External links
 National Diet Library,  Portraits of Modern Japanese Historical Figures, Kagami Kenkichi
 Insurance Hall of Fame,  Kenkichi Kagami

People from Gifu Prefecture
1869 births
1939 deaths
Japanese chief executives
Hitotsubashi University alumni